Eric Johnson Still (born June 28, 1967) is a former American football offensive guard who played college football at the University of Tennessee and attended Germantown High School in Germantown, Tennessee. He was drafted by the Houston Oilers in the fourth round of the 1990 NFL Draft. He was a consensus All-American in 1989. He played two season with the Frankfurt Galaxy of the World League of American Football.

References

External links
Just Sports Stats

Living people
1967 births
Players of American football from Louisiana
American football offensive guards
Tennessee Volunteers football players
Frankfurt Galaxy players
All-American college football players
Sportspeople from Fayetteville, North Carolina
People from Germantown, Tennessee